The Plain of Jars (Lao: ທົ່ງໄຫຫິນ Thong Hai Hin) is a megalithic archaeological landscape in Laos. It consists of thousands of stone jars scattered around the upland valleys and the lower foothills of the central plain of the Xiangkhoang Plateau. The jars are arranged in clusters ranging in number from one to several hundred.

The Xiangkhoang Plateau is at the northern end of the Annamese Cordillera, the principal mountain range of Indochina. French researcher Madeleine Colani concluded in 1930 that the jars were associated with burial practices. Excavation by Lao and Japanese archaeologists in the intervening years has supported this interpretation with the discovery of human remains, burial goods and ceramics around the jars. Researchers (using optically stimulated luminescence) determined that the jars were put in place as early as 1240 to 660 BC. The jars at Site 1 (using detrital zircon geochronology) were determined to have been transported to their current location from a presumed quarry eight kilometers away. The Plain of Jars is one of the most important prehistoric sites in Southeast Asia.

The jar sites
More than 90 jar sites have been identified in Xiangkhouang Province. Each site has from one to 400 stone jars. The jars vary in height and diameter between 1 m and 3 m and are all hewn from rock. Their shape is cylindrical with the bottom always wider than the top. The stone jars are undecorated, with the exception of a single jar at Site 1. This jar has a human "frogman" bas-relief carved on the exterior. Parallels between the "frogman" and the rock painting at Huashan in Guangxi, China have been drawn. The Chinese paintings, which depict large full-frontal images of humans with arms raised and knees bent, date to 500 BC–200 AD.

Since most of the jars have lip rims, it is thought that the jars originally supported lids, although few stone lids have been recorded; this suggests that the bulk of lids were fashioned from perishable materials. Stone lids with animal carvings have been found at a few sites such as Ban Phakeo (Site 52). The bas-relief carvings are thought to depict monkeys, tigers and frogs.

Stone discs have also been found. The discs, which differ from the lids, have at least one flat side and are grave markers which were placed on the surface to cover or mark a burial pit. These grave markers appear more rarely than jars, but are found in close proximity. Similarly, the stone grave markers are unworked, but have been intentionally placed to mark a grave. To the north of Xiangkhouang an extensive network of intentionally placed largely unworked stones marking elaborate burial pits and chambers are known as the "standing stones of Huaphanh". These have been dated to the Bronze Age.

The jars lie in clusters on the lower foothills and ridges of the hills surrounding the central plateau and upland valleys. Several quarry sites have been recorded, usually close to the jar sites. Five rock types have been identified: sandstone, granite, conglomerate, limestone and breccia. The majority of the jars are sandstone. It is assumed that Plain of Jars people used iron chisels to manufacture the jars, although no conclusive evidence for this exists. Regional differences in jar shape have been noted. While the differences in most cases can be attributed to choice and manipulation of rock source, some differences in form (such as variations in the placement of jar apertures) appear to be unique to specific sites.

A cave at Site 1 is a natural limestone formation with an opening to the northwest and two man-made holes at the top. These holes are thought to have been  chimneys for a crematorium. French geologist and amateur archaeologist Madeleine Colani excavated inside the cave in the early 1930s and found material to support a crematorium theory. Colani also recorded and excavated at twelve Plain of Jars sites and published two volumes with her findings in 1935. Colani concluded that the Plain of Jars was an Iron Age burial site. Inside the jars she found, embedded in black organic soil, coloured glass beads and burnt teeth and bone fragments, sometimes from more than one individual. Around the stone jars, she found human bones, pottery fragments, iron and bronze objects, glass and stone beads, ceramic weights and charcoal. The bone and teeth inside the jars show signs of cremation, while the burials surrounding the jars yield unburnt secondary burial bones.

No further archaeological research was conducted until November 1994, when Professor Eiji Nitta of Kagoshima University and Lao archaeologist Thongsa Sayavongkhamdy surveyed and mapped Site 1. Nitta claimed that the surrounding burial pits were contemporaneous to the jars, as they were cut into the surface on which the jars had been placed. Nitta believed the jars were symbolic monuments to mark the surrounding burials. He dated the Plain of Jars to the late second or early first millennium BC based on the burial urn and associated grave goods. Sayavongkhamdy undertook surveys and excavations between 1994 and 1996, supported by the Australian National University. Sayavongkhamdy and Peter Bellwood interpreted the stone jars as a central person's primary or secondary burial, surrounded by secondary burials of family members. Archaeological data collected during bomb clearance operations supervised by UNESCO archaeologist Julie Van Den Bergh in 2004–2005 and again in 2007 provided similar archaeological results. Like Nitta, Van Den Bergh concluded that the jars and surrounding burials were contemporaneous.

Variations in the practices of cremation inside jars and secondary burial outside jars, as noted by Colani, have proven difficult to explain. The cremated remains seem to mainly belong to adolescents. While the bomb clearance operations did not involve emptying the jars and thus no additional evidence could be gathered, Van Den Bergh suggested that the stone jars initially may have been used to distill the dead bodies and that the cremated remains within the jars represent the most recent phase in the Plain of Jars. The jars with smaller apertures may reflect the diminishing need to place an entire body inside.

The suggestion that the jars, as in traditional Southeast Asian royal mortuary practices, functioned as "distilling vessels", was put forward by R. Engelhardt and P. Rogers in 2001. In contemporary funerary practices followed by Thai, Cambodian, and Laotian royalty, the corpse of the deceased is placed into an urn during the early stages of the funeral rites, at which time the soul of deceased is believed to be undergoing gradual transformation from the earthly to the spiritual world. The ritual decomposition is later followed by cremation and secondary burial.

The royal burials are across watercourses from the habitation areas in a geographically high, prominent area. Among the Black Thai people who have been in the region at least since the 11th century, the upper classes are cremated in the belief that it will release their spirits to heaven, while commoners are buried, leaving their spirits to remain on Earth.

Colani connected the location of the jars sites to ancient trade routes, in particular with the salt trade. She assumed that salt was a commodity sought after by the Plain of Jars people, which brought traders to the Xiangkhouang Plateau. The Xiangkhouang area is rich in metallic minerals, mainly due to granite intrusions and associated hydrothermal activity.

Two principal iron ore deposits exist in Laos, both in Xiangkhouang. The presence and locations of the numerous jar sites in Xiangkhouang may relate to trading and mining activities. History has shown that Xiangkhouang, at the northern end of the Annamite Range, provides relative easy passage from the north and east to the south and west.

Within the geographic setting of Xiangkhouang, the jar sites may reflect a network of intercultural villages, whereby the locations of the jars are associated with long-distance overland routes which connect the Mekong basin and the Gulf of Tonkin System. The jar sites show superficial regional differences, such as jar form, material, and the number of jars per site, but all share common setting characteristics such as burial practices, elevated locations, and commanding views over the surrounding area.

The most investigated and visited Jar site is close to the town of Phonsavan, and is known as Site 1. Seven jar sites have now been cleared of unexploded bombs and are open to visitors. These are currently sites 1, 2 and 3, and Site 16 near the old capital Xieng Khouang; Site 23, near the big hot spring in Muang Kham; Site 25 in the largely unvisited Phou Kout District; and Site 52, the largest known jar site to date with 392 jars near a traditional Hmong village only accessible by foot.

Legends and local history

Lao legends tell of a race of giants who inhabited the area and who were ruled by a king, named Khun Cheung, who fought a long and ultimately victorious battle against an enemy. He supposedly created the jars to brew and store huge amounts of lau hai (lau means 'alcohol', hai means 'jar'—So lau hai means 'rice beer' or 'rice wine' in the jars) to celebrate his victory. Another local story states that the jars were molded from natural materials including clay, sand, sugar, and animal products in a type of stone mix. This led the locals to believe the cave at Site 1 was actually a kiln, and that the jars were fired there and are not actually hewn from stone.

Present day
Between May 1964 and the summer of 1969, the Plain of Jars was heavily bombed by the U.S. Air Force (USAF) (see Secret War) operating against North Vietnamese and Pathet Lao communist forces. This included 262 million anti-personnel cluster bombs. An estimated 80 million of these did not explode and remain a deadly threat to the population.

The large quantity of unexploded bombs in the area, especially cluster munitions, limits free movement. Evidence of the bombing raids can be seen in the form of broken or displaced jars and bomb craters. Sightseeing on the Plain of Jars can only be done safely on cleared and marked pathways.

The Mines Advisory Group, a non-governmental organization, in collaboration with UNESCO and funded by the New Zealand government (NZAID), cleared unexploded bombs from the three most visited sites from July 2004 to July 2005. A second phase of bomb clearance at the sites also funded by NZAID was undertaken in 2007; four more jar sites were made safe.

On 6 July 2019, the Plain of Jars was inscribed as a UNESCO World Heritage Site.

See also
 Campaign Z
 Bomb Harvest
 List of megalithic sites
 Sa Huỳnh culture

References

Sources
 Baldock, J and J. Van Den Bergh 2009. "Geological Mysteries at the Plain of Jars begin to unravel". Geology Today. August 2009.
Box, P. 2000. Overview Mapping Using GIS, UNESCO Plain of Jars Cultural Heritage Documentation Project, Richard A Engelhardt, ed., UNESCO Regional Advisor for Culture in Asia and the Pacific, Bangkok.
Box, P. 2001. Mapping Megaliths and Unexploded Ordnance, UNESCO Plain of Jars Cultural Heritage Documentation Project, Richard A Engelhardt, ed., UNESCO Regional Advisor for Culture in Asia and the Pacific, Bangkok.
Box, P. 2003, "Safeguarding the Plain of Jars: Megaliths and Unexploded Ordnance in the Lao People’s Democratic Republic". ESRI, Journal of GIS in Archaeology, Volume 1-April 2003.
 Fred Branfman (compiled by): Voices from the Plain of Jars - Life under an Air War; Harper & Row 1972.
 Karen J. Coates - '"Plain of Jars" (Archaeology, July/August 2005)
 Colani, Madeleine 1935. Megaliths du Haut Laos, Publication de l'École française d'Extrême-Orient XXV-XXVI, Paris.
 Giteau, M. 2001, Art et Archeologie du Laos, Editions A et J Picard, Paris, pp. 37–57.
 Higham, C. 1989. The Archaeology of Mainland Southeast Asia, From 10,000 B.C. to the Fall of Angkor, Cambridge World Archaeology, Cambridge University Press, Cambridge. pp. 228–230.
 Nitta E. 1996. "Comparative study on the jar burial traditions in Vietnam, Thailand and Laos". Historical Science Reports, Kagoshima University 43: 1-19.
 Rogers P., R. Engelhardt, P. Box, J. Van Den Bergh, Samlane Luangaphay and Chantone Chantavong 2003. "The UNESCO project: Safeguarding the Plain of Jars". In A. Karlström, and A. Källén (eds) Fishbones and Glittering Emblems: Southeast Asian Archaeology 2002. Stockholm: Museum of Far Eastern Antiquities.
 Rogers, P. and J. Van Den Bergh 2008. "Legacy of a Secret War: archaeological research and bomb clearance in the Plain of Jars, Lao PDR". In E. Bacus, I. Glover and P. Sharrock (eds) Interpreting Southeast Asian's Past. Monument, Image and Text. Selected Papers from 10th Conference of EASAA, Vol. 2: 400-408.
 Sayavongkhamdy Thongsa and Peter Bellwood 2001. "Recent Archaeological Research in Laos". Bulletin of the Indo-Pacific Prehistory Association 19: 101-10.
 Stone, R. 2007. "Archaeology: Saving a Lost Culture's Megalithic Jars, Xieng Khouang, Laos", Science, 16, February 2007: Vol. 315. no. 5814, pp. 934 – 935.
 Bounmy Thepsimuong. The Plain of Jars. A Guide Book. Vientiane 2004.
 Van Den Bergh Julie 2007. "Safeguarding the Plain of Jars, an Overview". Y. Goudineau and M. Lorrilard. (eds.) Etudes thematiques 18. New Research on Laos-Recherches nouveles sur le Laos.

Further reading

External links

 UNESCO website for the Plain of Jars and Safeguarding the Plain of Jars Project 

Archaeological sites in Laos
Iron Age
Megalithic monuments
Buildings and structures in Xiangkhouang province
Tourist attractions in Laos
Laotian Civil War
World Heritage Sites in Laos